Roberto Draghetti (August 24, 1960 – July 24, 2020) was an Italian voice actor.

Biography
Born in Rome and the older brother of actress and voice actress Francesca Draghetti, he started his career as a voice dubber at some point during the 1980s. He was known for being the official dubber of actors Jamie Foxx, Noah Emmerich, Terry Crews and Idris Elba. Other actors Draghetti dubbed included Mickey Rourke, Djimon Hounsou, Tyler Perry, Tyrese Gibson, Ray Stevenson and many more in a majority of their work.

Draghetti also worked in animation, giving his voice to animated characters as well, which includes Maurice in the Madagascar franchise, Knut in Winx Club, Stoick the Vast in the How to Train Your Dragon franchise, Chef Hatchet in Total Drama, Fat Tony in The Simpsons and Eddy in Ed, Edd n Eddy.

Death
Draghetti died on 24 July 2020 after having suffered a heart attack one month short of his 60th birthday. He was survived by his daughter, Malvina.

Dubbing roles

Animation 
Maurice in Madagascar
Maurice in Madagascar: Escape 2 Africa
Maurice in Madagascar 3: Europe's Most Wanted
Maurice in The Penguins of Madagascar
Eddy in Ed, Edd n Eddy
Cyborg in Teen Titans (seasons 1-4)
Fat Tony in The Simpsons (season 3-31)
Snake Jailbird in The Simpsons (seasons 14-31)
Lenny Leonard in The Simpsons (season 8)
Superintendent Chalmers in The Simpsons (seasons 14-31)
Terry Kimple in The Cleveland Show
Chernabog in House of Mouse
Officer Earl Devereaux in Cloudy with a Chance of Meatballs
Officer Earl Devereaux in Cloudy with a Chance of Meatballs 2
Dim in A Bug's Life
Spike in Flushed Away
Great Counselor Otomo in The Tale of the Princess Kaguya
Master Thundering Rhino in Kung Fu Panda 2
Kai in Kung Fu Panda 3
Timandahaf in Asterix and the Vikings
Stoick the Vast in How to Train Your Dragon
Stoick the Vast in How to Train Your Dragon 2
Stoick the Vast in How to Train Your Dragon: The Hidden World
Stoick the Vast in DreamWorks Dragons
Marcel in Rio
Ay in Mr. Peabody & Sherman
Alley in Tom and Jerry: Spy Quest
Ben in Pocahontas
Gavin in Ice Age: Collision Course
Ted in Finding Nemo
Chef Hatchet in Total Drama
James in The Princess and the Frog
Greg Corbin in American Dad!
Bela in Hotel Transylvania 2
Buster in Lady and the Tramp II: Scamp's Adventure
Skeeter Valentine in Doug's 1st Movie
Frank in The Ugly Duckling and Me!
Cash in The Fox and the Hound 2
Starscream in Transformers: Armada
Starscream in Transformers: Energon
Starscream in Transformers: Cybertron
Captain Typho in Star Wars: Clone Wars
Russian Bear in Sing
Rookery in The Little Vampire 3D
Sauron in The Lego Batman Movie
Lucky in The Nut Job
Stabbington brothers in Rapunzel's Tangled Adventure
Tenzin in The Legend of Korra
Maxum Man in Sidekick
Brutish Guard in The Hunchback of Notre Dame
Bad Bill in Rango
Prince Darkos in Arthur and the Invisibles
Gyu Oh in Inuyasha (season 4 ep 13)
 Joe Tabootie in ChalkZone

Live action 
Drew Bundini Brown in Ali
Max Durocher in Collateral
Henry Purcell in Stealth
Sykes in Jarhead
Ricardo Tubbs in Miami Vice
Curtis Taylor Jr. in Dreamgirls
Ronald Fleury in The Kingdom
Nick Rice in Law Abiding Citizen
Nathaniel Ayers in The Soloist
Darryl Johnson in Due Date
Dean 'MF' Jones in Horrible Bosses
Dean 'MF' Jones in Horrible Bosses 2
Vincent Downs in Sleepless
Art in Project Power
Vernon in Serving Sara
Big Black Jack Latimore in Norbit
Darrell in Harsh Times
Agent 91 in Get Smart
Hale Caesar in The Expendables
Hale Caesar in The Expendables 2
Hale Caesar in The Expendables 3
Louis Coltrane / Marlon in The Truman Show
Charles Clusters in Windtalkers
Gordo Hersch in Frequency
Francis Tierney Jr. in Pride and Glory
Bill in Fair Game
Ben Grimm / Thing in Fantastic Four
Ben Grimm / Thing in Fantastic Four: Rise of the Silver Surfer
Jim Paxton in Ant-Man
Jim Paxton in Ant-Man and the Wasp
Marv in Sin City
Marv in Sin City: A Dame to Kill For
Guy in Ted
Guy in Ted 2
Agustin Ramos / Moscow in Money Heist
Robert Epps in Transformers
Robert Epps in Transformers: Revenge of the Fallen
Robert Epps in Transformers: Dark of the Moon
Ajihad in Eragon
Arthur Koehler in J. Edgar
Robbie Robertson in Spider-Man
Robbie Robertson in Spider-Man 2
Robbie Robertson in Spider-Man 3
Billy in Once Upon a Time in Mexico
Dáin II Ironfoot in The Hobbit: The Battle of the Five Armies
Mark Casey in Taken
Mark Casey in Taken 2
Mark Casey in Taken 3
Dr. Gonzo in Fear and Loathing in Las Vegas
Volstagg in Thor
Volstagg in Thor: The Dark World
Volstagg in Thor: Ragnarok
Frank Nitti in Road to Perdition
Happy Jack Mulraney in Gangs of New York
Hugh Stamp in Mission: Impossible 2
Jack Arons in Bridge to Terabithia
Jack Bruno in Race to Witch Mountain
Jeff in Dancer in the Dark
Jonah Hex in Jonah Hex
Juan in Moonlight
King Ricou in Aquaman
Llewelyn Moss in No Country for Old Men
Professor James Arnold in Kingsman: The Secret Service
Roger Dearly in 101 Dalmatians
Toby Jay Wadenah in The Pledge
Tom Chaney in True Grit
Trumpkin in The Chronicles of Narnia: Prince Caspian
Wiglaf in Beowulf

Video games
Fairburne in Sniper Elite V2
Fairburne in Sniper Elite 3
Fairburne in Sniper Elite 4
Celebrimbor in Middle-earth: Shadow of Mordor
Dick Marcinko in Rogue Warrior
Keats in Folklore
General Chase in Fallout 3
Malcolm in Unreal Tournament 3
Garrosh Malogrido in World of Warcraft
Garrosh Malogrido Heroes of the Storm
Jack Vincent in Call of Duty: Black Ops III
Soldier 76 in Overwatch
Mr. Braun in Steins;Gate

References

External links
 
 
 

1960 births
2020 deaths
Male actors from Rome
Italian male voice actors
Italian male television actors
Italian male video game actors
20th-century Italian male actors
21st-century Italian male actors